is a former Japanese football player.

Playing career
Matsuura was born in Hiroshima Prefecture on January 10, 1982. After graduating from Tokyo Gakugei University, he joined J2 League club Mito HollyHock in 2004. He debuted on May 19 and played many matches as forward in 2004 season. He retired end of 2004 season.

Club statistics

References

External links

1982 births
Living people
Tokyo Gakugei University alumni
Association football people from Hiroshima Prefecture
Japanese footballers
J2 League players
Mito HollyHock players
Association football forwards